Iyal Mawmar is a sub-district located in Maswar District, 'Amran Governorate, Yemen. Iyal Mawmar had a population of 6310  according to the 2004 census.

References 

Sub-districts in Maswar District